Rușii-Munți (Hungarian pronunciation: , meaning "Russian Village on the Mureș") is a commune in Mureș County, Transylvania, Romania that is composed of four villages: Maiorești (formerly Huduc; Monosfalu), Morăreni (Maroslaka), Rușii-Munți and Sebeș (Sebespatak).

It has a population of 2,252: 95% Romanians, 1% Hungarians and 4% Roma.

See also
List of Hungarian exonyms (Mureș County)

References

Communes in Mureș County
Localities in Transylvania